Parascolopsis capitinis, is a fish found in the Western Indian Ocean found off of Trincomalee, Sri Lanka.. 

References

Fish of the Indian Ocean
Taxa named by Barry C. Russell
Fish described in 1996
Nemipteridae